The women's 100 metres hurdles event at the 1983 Summer Universiade was held at the Commonwealth Stadium in Edmonton, Canada on 6 and 7 July 1983.

Medalists

Results

Heats

Wind:Heat 1: +1.6 m/s, Heat 2: +1.8 m/s

Final

Wind: +0.1 m/s

References

Athletics at the 1983 Summer Universiade
1983